Two ships in the United States Navy have been named USS Young, the first for John Young (c. 1740–1781), a captain in the Continental Navy, and the second for Rear Admiral Lucien Young (1852–1912).

See also
 , a 
  was also named for Captain Young. She was launched in 1976 and stricken in 2002.
 , a destroyer escort

United States Navy ship names